Třebenice may refer to places in the Czech Republic:

 Třebenice (Litoměřice District), a town in the Ústí nad Labem Region
 Třebenice (Třebíč District), a municipality and village in the Vysočina Region